Hemiarius verrucosus, the shovelnose sea catfish, is a species of catfish in the family Ariidae. It was described by Heok Hee Ng in 2003, originally under the genus Arius. It inhabits rivers and estuaries in Laos and Thailand, including the Mekong, Bang Pakong and Chao Phraya Rivers. Its diet includes finfish and shellfish.

References

Ariidae
Fish described in 2003